Lizzy Hawker (born 10 March 1976) is a British endurance athlete. She has been dubbed as the Queen of the mountains, running ultramarathons while climbing the heights of Mount Everest. Some of her career highlights include five wins at the Ultra-Trail du Mont-Blanc (UTMB), former World Record holder for 24 Hours, and winner of the 2006 IAU 100 km World Championships.

Lizzy conducted climate change work with the British Antarctic Survey and holds a PhD in Physical oceanography from the University of Southampton.

Early life
Hawker grew up in Upminster, a suburb of London. Visiting Zermatt in the Swiss Alps at the age of six, she fell for the mountains, to which she would relocate later in life.

Career
Hawker's first taste of long-distance running was the London Marathon in 2000.

Hawker first ran the Ultra-Trail du Mont-Blanc (UTMB) in 2005. Although she had never owned a pair of trail-running shoes until 10 days before the race she won it at her first attempt. In all she won the race a record five times. She completed her Ph.D. in physical oceanography then realized she was not meant to be a researcher, and put her focus on long distance running in the mountains.

After the first race, The North Face offered her sponsorship, which Hawker accepted. She continued to work as a researcher for the British Antarctic Survey until 2007, when she relocated to the Laufschule Scuol, a training centre in the Swiss Alps. In the intervening years, Hawker won the 2006 IAU 100km World Championships, and in 2007 set the record for running the 199 miles between Mount Everest South Base Camp and Kathmandu, Nepal, in 77 hours 36 minutes.

The 2010 IAU 100 km World Championships saw Hawker lead the way for most of the race, battling with her compatriot Ellie Greenwood but she faded towards the end to take bronze behind Greenwood and Monica Carlin of Italy, the previous year's third-place finisher. This also earned her a bronze in the jointly hosted IAU 100 km European Championships. In 2011, she set the women's world record for distance run in 24 hours with 153.5 miles in Llandudno, Wales. She also improved on her Everest record with a time of 71 hours 25 minutes. The following year Hawker won the UTMB, the 100-mile Run Rabbit Run in Colorado, and the 155-mile Spartathlon while setting a new women's record and placing third overall.

She beat her Everest Base Camp–Kathmandu time in 2013, completing the distance in 63 hours.

Hawker says that she has suffered few injuries in her career, except in the two years up to 2015, when she suffered six stress fractures. She has a reputation for recovering quickly after major races.

While training for the UTMB, Hawker ran along the footpath of the Tour de Monte Rosa many times. This experience led her to create a new race, the Ultra Tour Monte Rosa, which runs for 93 miles from Grächen to Zermatt, on through villages in Italy, before returning to the start point. It incorporates more than 32,000 feet of ascent and descent over technical terrain. The inaugural "Zero Edition" took place in August 2015.

Hawker ran, hiked and climbed 1,600 km across the Himalayas in Nepal in 2016.

She is the author of Runner: A short story about a long run, her account of finishing the Ultra Trail Tour du Mont Blanc as first woman.

Personal life
Hawker gained a PhD in physical oceanography in 2005 from Southampton University, while working for the British Antarctic Survey, studying climate change along the Antarctic coastline.

She lives in Switzerland, and is a keen skier, climber and mountaineer.

Hawker is a strict vegetarian since five years old.

See also
List of Mount Everest records

References

External links

1976 births
Living people
People from Upminster
British ultramarathon runners
British female long-distance runners
Place of birth missing (living people)
Female ultramarathon runners
British sky runners
Trail runners
20th-century British women